The 1895 Illinois Cycling Club football team was an American football team that represented the Illinois Cycling Club in the 1895 college football season.  The Illinois Cycling Club played the Cycling Club from Lake View for the "Chicago Cycling Club Championship" on Thanksgiving Day.  The prize was a white rooster that had been traded by the two teams since at least the year prior.  In 1894, Illinois Cycling Club defeated the Lake View Cycling Club to take possession of this rooster, which became their team mascot.  Lake View CC was undefeated coming into the contest, but fell to the Illinois cyclists 0 to 16 in front of a Thanksgiving crowd of 2,000, which was exactly the same as the final score for the 1894 contest.  After the game, Lake View asserted that the game would not count to determine the championship, as the field was snowy and small.  Illinois agreed, and the championship was split between the two teams.

Schedule

Second team schedule
The Cycling Club's second team played one game, against the secondary from Irving Park on Thanksgiving.

References

Illinois Cycling Club
Illinois Cycling Club football seasons
Illinois Cycling Club football